Abram Ernest (Ernie) Epp (born September 28, 1941) is a Canadian historian and former politician. Currently a professor of Canadian and environmental history at Lakehead University in Thunder Bay, Ontario, he represented the electoral district of Thunder Bay—Nipigon in the House of Commons of Canada from 1984 to 1988 as a member of the New Democratic Party. He defeated Liberal incumbent Jack Masters in the 1984 Canadian federal election to represent the seat and lost it to Liberal challenger Joe Comuzzi in 1988.

As a historian, his publications include From Rivalry to Unity: A History of Thunder Bay (1995) and The North American Fur Trade: Pivotal Interpretations (1995).

Epp was born in Winnipeg, Manitoba, Canada.

External links
 Lakehead University Profile Page
 

1941 births
20th-century Canadian historians
Canadian male non-fiction writers
Academic staff of Lakehead University
Living people
Members of the House of Commons of Canada from Ontario
New Democratic Party MPs
Politicians from Thunder Bay
Politicians from Winnipeg
Writers from Winnipeg
Writers from Thunder Bay
Canadian Mennonites
Mennonite writers